Petrus 'Pierre' Breitenbach (born 25 March 1987) is a South African lawn bowler.

Bowls career
He competed in the men's triples at the 2014 Commonwealth Games where he won a gold medal.

He won the 2013 fours at the National Championships bowling for the Potchefstroom Town Bowls Club.

In 2020 he was selected for the 2020 World Outdoor Bowls Championship in Australia. In 2022, he competed in the men's triples and the men's fours at the 2022 Commonwealth Games.

References

1987 births
Living people
People from Potchefstroom
Bowls players at the 2014 Commonwealth Games
Bowls players at the 2022 Commonwealth Games
Commonwealth Games gold medallists for South Africa
South African male bowls players
Commonwealth Games medallists in lawn bowls
20th-century South African people
21st-century South African people
Medallists at the 2014 Commonwealth Games